The Manoir de Stang-al-lin is a manor-house located in the Finistère département of Brittany in northwestern France. It is located in the small town of Concarneau, near Quimper. It was erected by Gustave Bonduelle in 1903.

History

The General Counsel of the canton of Concarneau, Gustave Bonduelle buys land in 1902 from the field Keriolet in the town of Beuzec-Conq and there built the following year the manor of Stang-al-Lin.
Currently, the manor was owned by the family Denier.

Architecture
The manor was built according to the Gothic Revival architecture.

Preservation efforts

See also
 Concarneau
 Château de Keriolet
 List of châteaux in Brittany

Notes

References
  Manoir's history
  Archives départementales du Finistère, liasse n° 37X9, thèse de Nolwenn Rannou, opuscule 
  Il était une fois Kériolet de Stéphanie Gohin et interview de MM. Nerzic, Lévèque et Drouglazet.
 

Stang-al-lin
Manor houses in France
Concarneau